Presidential Adviser is a title used by advisers to the President of Sri Lanka. Presidential Advisers are attached to but are not part of the Presidential Secretariat. The title has been used formally since 1990's to differentiate from more senior Senior Advisers to the President and Coordinating Secretaries.

Notable presidential advisers
Gamini Iriyagolla 
 Austin Fernando
 Dr Chris Nonis

See also
 Senior Adviser to the President of Sri Lanka
 Special adviser (UK)

References

Presidents of Sri Lanka
Sri Lankan presidential advisers